John Gouldstone (aka Goldstone or Goldswain) was an Essex and All-England cricketer of the late 18th century. Details of Gouldstone, including his first name, have not been found in extant records.  He was a member of Hornchurch Cricket Club which was the leading Essex club at the time.

He is known to have sometimes used the pseudonym of Goldswain and this appears in some scorecards.

Gouldstone made 15 known first-class appearances between 1785 and 1793.

References

English cricketers
Essex cricketers
Year of birth unknown
Year of death unknown
English cricketers of 1787 to 1825
R. Leigh's XI cricketers
Hornchurch Cricket Club cricketers